Riponnensia is a genus of hoverflies.

Species
Riponnensia daccordii (Claussen, 1991)
Riponnensia insignis (Loew, 1843)
Riponnensia longicornis (Loew, 1843)
Riponnensia morini Vujic, 1999
Riponnensia splendens (Meigen, 1822)

References

Diptera of Europe
Hoverfly genera
Eristalinae